Sonia Bermúdez Tribano (born 15 November 1984), commonly known as Sonia or Soni, is a Spanish retired footballer who played as a forward. She was a member of the Spain women's national team.

With previous passages for Rayo Vallecano, FC Barcelona, NWSL club Western New York Flash and Atlético Madrid, she won the women's Primera División seven consecutive times (three with Rayo Vallecano and four with Barcelona) from 2008–09 until 2014–15.

Club career
She played for Estudiantes Huelva before joining CE Sabadell in 2003.

In seven years with Rayo Vallecano, she contributed to the club's first Spanish league trophy—scoring 22 goals throughout the 2008–09 season, ranking third at the top scorers table.

She won the 2011–12 Primera División top scorer award with 38 goals for champions Barcelona. In 2012–13 Barcelona retained their title and Sonia scored 21 times to finish joint-top scorer with Rayo's Natalia Pablos. In 2014, she had a quick break at her Barcelona career when she joined the Western New York Flash from NWSL, returning to Barcelona for the 2014–15 season.

In 2015, after four seasons at Barcelona – which included a passage in 2014 with the Western New York Flash from NWSL – she opted to join Atlético Madrid ahead of the 2015–16 season.

International career
In October 2002, Sonia was named in the Spanish squad for the 2003 UEFA Women's Under-19 Championship.

A member of the senior Spanish national team, she scored against England and Northern Ireland at the UEFA Women's Euro 2009 qualifying. In Spain's first game of the UEFA Women's Euro 2013 qualifying campaign, Sonia was named to the squad and listed as an FC Barcelona player. She scored the fourth goal in Spain's 10–1 win in Turkey.

In June 2013, national team coach Ignacio Quereda named Sonia in his squad for the UEFA Women's Euro 2013 finals in Sweden.

She was part of Spain's squad at the 2015 FIFA Women's World Cup in Canada.

International goals

Honours

Club
 Rayo Vallecano
 Primera División: Winner 2008–09, 2009–10, 2010–11
 Copa de la Reina de Fútbol: Winner 2008

 FC Barcelona
 Primera División: Winner 2011–12, 2012–13, 2013–14, 2014–15
 Copa de la Reina de Fútbol: Winner 2013, 2014

Atlético Madrid
 Primera División: Winner 2016-17, 2017-18
 Copa de la Reina de Fútbol:Winner 2016

International
 Spain
 Algarve Cup: Winner 2017

References

External links

 
 
 Profile at FC Barcelona
 

1984 births
Living people
Footballers from Madrid
Spanish women's footballers
Women's association football forwards
CF Pozuelo de Alarcón Femenino players
CE Sabadell Femení players
Rayo Vallecano Femenino players
FC Barcelona Femení players
Western New York Flash players
Atlético Madrid Femenino players
Levante UD Femenino players
Primera División (women) players
National Women's Soccer League players
Spain women's youth international footballers
Spain women's international footballers
2015 FIFA Women's World Cup players
Spanish expatriate footballers
Spanish expatriate sportspeople in the United States
Expatriate women's soccer players in the United States